Percival Turnbull (25 October 1862 – 12 March 1937) was an Australian-born New Zealand cricketer who played for Otago. He was born in Hobart and died in Christchurch.

Turnbull made a single first-class appearance for the team, during the 1884–85 season, against Auckland. From the tailend, he scored a single run in the first innings in which he batted, and a duck in the second.

From 58 overs of bowling, Turnbull took match figures of 3-67.

Turnbull's brother, Albert, made a single first-class appearance for the team.

See also
 List of Otago representative cricketers

External links
Percival Turnbull at Cricket Archive

1862 births
1937 deaths
Burials at Linwood Cemetery, Christchurch
New Zealand cricketers
Otago cricketers
Australian emigrants to New Zealand